"The Monkey Time" is a song written by Curtis Mayfield and performed by Major Lance.  It reached No. 2 on the U.S. R&B chart and No. 8 on the U.S. pop chart in 1963.  It was featured on his 1963 album The Monkey Time.

The song was arranged by Johnny Pate produced by Carl Davis.

The song ranked No. 49 on Billboard magazine's Top 100 singles of 1963.

Other charting versions
The Tubes released a version of the song as a single in 1983 which reached No. 16 on the U.S. rock chart and No. 68 on U.S. pop chart.  It was featured on their album Outside Inside.

Other versions
The Miracles released a version of the song on their 1963 album The Miracles Doin' Mickey's Monkey.
Georgie Fame released a version of the song on his 1964 album Fame at Last.
Gene Barge released a version of the song on his 1965 album Dance with Daddy "G".
Archie Bell & the Drells released a version of the song on their 1968 album I Can't Stop Dancing.
The Mad Lads released a version of the song entitled "Monkey Time '69" on their 1969 album The Mad, Mad, Mad, Mad, Mad Lads.
Laura Nyro and Labelle released a version of the song as a medley with "Dancing in the Street" on their 1971 album Gonna Take a Miracle.
Al Kooper released a version of the song on his 1972 album A Possible Projection of the Future / Childhood's End.  Kooper also released it as a single the same year, but it did not chart.
Johnny Rivers released a version of the song on his 1977 album Outside Help.
Jimmy Burns released a version of the song on his 1999 album Night Time Again.
The Action released a live version of the song on their 2004 compilation album Uptight and Outasight.
The Velvelettes released a version of the song on their 2004 compilation album The Velvelettes: The Motown Anthology.

References

1963 songs
1963 singles
1972 singles
1983 singles
Songs written by Curtis Mayfield
Major Lance songs
The Tubes songs
Song recordings produced by David Foster
Song recordings produced by Al Kooper
Okeh Records singles
Columbia Records singles